Ryan Cuthbert (born December 13, 1979 in Carleton Place, Ontario) is a Canadian sprint canoer who has competed since the mid-2000s. Competing in two Summer Olympics, he earned his best finish of ninth in the K-4 1000 m event at Athens in 2004.

References
 Sports-Reference.com profile

1979 births
Canadian male canoeists
Canoeists at the 2004 Summer Olympics
Living people
Olympic canoeists of Canada
People from Carleton Place